General elections were held in Azad Kashmir on 21 July 2016 to elect 41 members of the Azad Kashmir Legislative Assembly. Polling started at 8:00am and continued until 5:00pm.

Campaign
At least 423 candidates ran for the 41 seats, the main competition being between the Pakistan Muslim League-Nawaz (PML-N), Pakistan Tehreek-e-Insaf (PTI), All Jammu and Kashmir Muslim Conference (MC) and the Pakistan People’s Party (PPP). 5,427 polling stations were set up for the election

Results
2,674,586 people were registered to vote in the elections, of whom 1,190,839 were female and 1,483,747 male.

The PML-N won 31, the PPP three and PTI two. In addition, AJ&K MC won three seats, JK PPP one seat and one seat was won by an independent.

Following these results, the Pakistan Muslim League (N) was able to form a comfortable majority government, with Raja Farooq Haider as prime minister of Azad Kashmir, controlling 31 general seats and six reserved/technocrat seats, giving them 37 out of the 49 seats in the assembly.

See also
List of members of the 8th Legislative Assembly of Azad Kashmir

References

Azad
Azad